A spaceport or cosmodrome is a site for launching or receiving spacecraft, by analogy to a seaport for ships or an airport for aircraft.  The word spaceport, and even more so cosmodrome, has traditionally been used for sites capable of launching spacecraft into orbit around Earth or on interplanetary trajectories. However, rocket launch sites for purely sub-orbital flights are sometimes called spaceports, as in recent years new and proposed sites for suborbital human flights have been frequently referred to or named "spaceports". Space stations and proposed future bases on the Moon are sometimes called spaceports, in particular if intended as a base for further journeys.

The term rocket launch site is used for any facility from which rockets are launched. It may contain one or more launch pads or suitable sites to mount a transportable launch pad. It is typically surrounded by a large safety area, often called a rocket range or missile range. The range includes the area over which launched rockets are expected to fly, and within which some components of the rockets may land. Tracking stations are sometimes located in the range to assess the progress of the launches.

Major spaceports often include more than one launch complex, which can be rocket launch sites adapted for different types of launch vehicles. (These sites can be well-separated for safety reasons.) For launch vehicles with liquid propellant, suitable storage facilities and, in some cases, production facilities are necessary. On-site processing facilities for solid propellants are also common.

A spaceport may also include runways for takeoff and landing of aircraft to support spaceport operations, or to enable support of HTHL or HTVL winged launch vehicles.

History

The first rockets to reach space were V-2 rockets launched from Peenemünde, Germany in 1944 during World War II. After the war, 70 complete V-2 rockets were brought to White Sands for test launches, with 47 of them reaching altitudes between 100 km and 213 km.

The world's first spaceport for orbital and human launches, the Baikonur Cosmodrome in southern Kazakhstan, started as a Soviet military rocket range in 1955. It achieved the first orbital flight (Sputnik 1) in October 1957.  The exact location of the cosmodrome was initially held secret. Guesses to its location were misdirected by a name in common with a mining town 320 km away. The position became known in 1957 outside the Soviet Union only after U-2 planes had identified the site by following railway lines in the Kazakh SSR, although Soviet authorities did not confirm the location for decades.

The Baikonur Cosmodrome achieved the first launch of a human into space (Yuri Gagarin) in 1961. The launch complex used, Site 1, has reached a special symbolic significance and is commonly called Gagarin's Start. Baikonur was the primary Soviet cosmodrome, and is still frequently used by Russia under a lease arrangement with Kazakhstan.

In response to the early Soviet successes, the United States built up a major spaceport complex at Cape Canaveral in Florida. A large number of uncrewed flights, as well as the early human flights, were carried out at Cape Canaveral Space Force Station. For the Apollo programme, an adjacent spaceport, Kennedy Space Center, was constructed, and achieved the first crewed mission to the lunar surface (Apollo 11) in July 1969. It was the base for all Space Shuttle launches and most of their runway landings. For details on the launch complexes of the two spaceports, see List of Cape Canaveral and Merritt Island launch sites.

The Guiana Space Centre in Kourou, French Guiana, is the major European spaceport, with satellite launches that benefit from the location 5 degrees north of the equator.

In October 2003 the Jiuquan Satellite Launch Center achieved the first Chinese human spaceflight.

Breaking with tradition, in June 2004 on a runway at Mojave Air and Space Port, California, a human was for the first time launched to space in a privately funded, suborbital spaceflight, that was intended to pave the way for future commercial spaceflights. The spacecraft, SpaceShipOne, was launched by a carrier airplane taking off horizontally.

At Cape Canaveral, SpaceX in 2015 made the first successful landing and recovery of a first stage used in a vertical satellite launch.

Location 
Rockets can most easily reach satellite orbits if launched near the equator in an easterly direction, as this maximizes use of the Earth's rotational speed (465 m/s at the equator). Such launches also provide a desirable orientation for arriving at a geostationary orbit. For polar orbits and Molniya orbits this does not apply.

In principle, advantages of high altitude launch are reduced vertical distance to travel and a thinner atmosphere for the rocket to penetrate. However, altitude of the launch site is not a driving factor in spaceport placement because most of the delta-v for a launch is spent on achieving the required horizontal orbital speed. The small gain from a few kilometers of extra altitude does not usually off-set the logistical costs of ground transport in mountainous terrain.

Many spaceports have been placed at existing military installations, such as intercontinental ballistic missile ranges, which are not always physically ideal sites for launch.

A rocket launch site is built as far as possible away from major population centers in order to mitigate risk to bystanders should a rocket experience a catastrophic failure. In many cases a launch site is built close to major bodies of water to ensure that no components are shed over populated areas. Typically a spaceport site is large enough that, should a vehicle explode, it will not endanger human lives or adjacent launch pads.

Planned sites of spaceports for sub-orbital tourist spaceflight often make use of existing ground infrastructure, including runways. The nature of the local view from  altitude is also a factor to consider.

Space tourism 

The space tourism industry (see List of private spaceflight companies) is being targeted by spaceports in numerous locations worldwide. e.g. Spaceport America, New Mexico.

The establishment of spaceports for tourist trips raises legal issues, which are only beginning to be addressed.

With achieved vertical launches of humans
The following is a table of spaceports and launch complexes for vertical launchers with documented achieved launches of humans to space (more than  altitude). The sorting order is spaceport by spaceport according to the time of the first human launch.

† Three of the Soyuz missions were uncrewed and are not counted (Soyuz 2, Soyuz 20, Soyuz 34).

‡ STS-51-L (Challenger) failed to reach orbit and is not counted. STS-107 (Columbia) reached orbit and is therefore included in the count (disaster struck on re-entry).

With achieved satellite launches
The following is a table of spaceports with a documented achieved launch to orbit. The table is sorted according to the time of the first launch that achieved satellite orbit insertion. The first column gives the geographical location. Operations from a different country are indicated in the fourth column. A launch is counted as one also in cases where the payload consists of multiple satellites.

With achieved horizontal launches of humans to 100 km
The following table shows spaceports with documented achieved launches of humans to at least 100 km altitude, starting from a horizontal runway. All the flights were sub-orbital.

Beyond Earth 
Spaceports have been proposed for locations on the Moon, Mars, orbiting the Earth, at Sun-Earth and Earth-Moon Lagrange points, and at other locations in the Solar System.  Human-tended outposts on the Moon or Mars, for example, will be spaceports by definition. The 2012 Space Studies Program of the International Space University studied the economic benefit of a network of spaceports throughout the solar system beginning from Earth and expanding outwardly in phases, within its team project Operations And Service Infrastructure for Space (OASIS). Its analysis claimed that the first phase, placing the "Node 1" spaceport with space tug services in low Earth orbit (LEO), would be commercially profitable and reduce transportation costs to geosynchronous orbit by as much as 44% (depending on the launch vehicle).  The second phase would add a Node 2 spaceport on the lunar surface to provide services including lunar ice mining and delivery of rocket propellants back to Node 1.  This would enable lunar surface activities and further reduce transportation costs within and out from cislunar space. The third phase would add a Node 3 spaceport on the Martian moon Phobos to enable refueling and resupply prior to Mars surface landings, missions beyond Mars, and return trips to Earth. In addition to propellant mining and refueling, the network of spaceports could provide services such as power storage and distribution, in-space assembly and repair of spacecraft, communications relay, shelter, construction and leasing of infrastructure, maintaining spacecraft positioned for future use, and logistics.

See also 

Launch pad
List of human spaceflights
List of rocket launch sites
Office of Commercial Space Transportation (United States)
Orbital spaceflight
Port
Range safety
Spaceflight
Sub-orbital spaceflight

References

External links 
 
 
 U.S. Spaceports Online Reference Guide
 Center for Strategic and International Studies: Spaceports of the World
 Sheboygan Spaceport’s Future – Sea to Space
 HighBeam Research: Spaceflight of fancy: Lawmakers question fiscal feasibility of Southern New Mexico's proposed spaceport; supporters count on jobs. 
 Spaceport Earth: The Reinvention of Spaceflight Spaceport Earth: The Reinvention of Spaceflight - categories | Overlook Press

 
Russian inventions